Ignatyev, Ignatiev, or Ignatieff (masculine) or Ignatyeva (feminine) is a Russian surname derived from the name Ignatius, in Russian, Ignatiy/Ignaty. In the Imperial Russia the Ignatievs noble family was established sometimes in the 17th century as a cadet branch of the Pleshchevs family from Chernihiv (Czernihów). Along with Pleshchevs, the Ignatievs family takes its roots from a Muscovite boyar Theodore Biakont who emigrated from Chernihiv to Moscow sometime in the 14th century, see Alexius, Metropolitan of Kiev.

Ihnatyev and Ihnatiev is a transliteration of the name from Belarusian and Ukrainian languages. For more information, see Ge (Cyrillic).

Notable people with the surname include:

Aleksandr Ignatyev (b. 1971), Russian football player
Alexsandr Ignatyev (1912-1998), Russian sculptor
Alexandra Nikolaevna Ignatieff (b. 1939), Franco-Russian countess and Princess of San Stefano
Alexey Ignatyev (1877-1954), Russian count, statesman, and writer

Andrey Alexandrovich Ignatiev (1900-1973), Soviet army officer and Hero of the Soviet Union
Andrey Nikolayevich Ignatyev (1921–2012), Soviet army officer and Hero of the Soviet Union
Ardalion Ignatyev (1930-1998), Soviet athlete
Boris Ignatyev, Russian football manager
Gavriil Ignatyev (1768-1852), Russian infantry general
George Ignatieff (1913–1989), Canadian diplomat and recipient Pearson Medal of Peace (son of Pavel Ignatyev)
Grigory Ignatyev (1846-1898), Russian military communications engineer and inventor
Michael Ignatieff (b. 1947), Canadian politician, academic and broadcaster (son of George Ignatieff) 
Mikhail Ignatyev (disambiguation), several people
Nikolay Pavlovich Ignatyev (1832-1908), Russian statesman and diplomat
Nikolay Ignatyev (pilot) (1917-1994), Soviet aircraft pilot and Hero of the Soviet Union
Noel Ignatiev, history professor at the Massachusetts College of Art
Pavel Ignatieff (1870-1945), Russian count and minister of education (son of Nikolay Pavlovich Ignatyev)
Pavel Ignatyev (1973), Russian sculptor
Semyon Ignatyev (1904-1983), head of the Soviet secret police
Sergey Ignatyev (disambiguation), several people
Countess Sophia Ignatieva, Russian countess
Varnava Ignatyev (1867-1927), Russian/Soviet scientist in the field of children's and teenage hygiene
Vladislav Ignatyev (b. 1987), Russian football player currently playing for Lokomotiv
Vladyslav Ihnatyev (b. 1997), Ukrainian football player

See also
Ignateva Cave, a limestone cave in the Ural mountains of Russia
Ignatyeva (rural locality), a rural locality (a village) in Kurgan Oblast, Russia

Russian-language surnames
Patronymic surnames
Surnames from given names